Reijo Untamo Vähälä (born 7 March 1946) is a Finnish former high jumper. He placed second in men's high jump at the 1969 European Athletics Championships.

Career
In 1966 Vähälä won both the Finnish championship (2.04 m) and the Finnish under-21 championship (2.01 m) in men's high jump. In 1969 he only placed third at the Finnish championships and was not considered a potential medalist at the European Championships in Athens, but in the championship final he improved his Finnish record of 2.13 m twice, clearing first 2.14 m and then 2.17 m. Two other jumpers, Valentin Gavrilov of the Soviet Union and Erminio Azzaro of Italy, also cleared 2.17 m, and the medals were decided on countback with Vähälä winning a surprising silver.

Vähälä won his second Finnish national outdoor title in 1970 with a jump of 2.12 m; in addition, he was Finnish indoor champion in 1968 (2.03 m) and 1969 (2.00 m). He represented Finland again at the 1970 European Indoor Championships, where he placed 10th, and the 1971 European Championships, where he failed to qualify for the final.

References

1946 births
Living people
People from Alajärvi
Finnish male high jumpers
European Athletics Championships medalists
Sportspeople from South Ostrobothnia